San Policarpo, officially the Municipality of San Policarpo, is a 5th class municipality in the province of Eastern Samar, Philippines. According to the 2020 census, it has a population of 15,365 people.

In the north-west, it is bounded by Arteche, in the north-east by the vast Pacific Ocean and in the south by Oras.

History
San Policarpo was established as a barrio in 1837. The Municipality of San Policarpo was created from the barrios of San Policarpo, Bahay, Alugan, Pangpang, Japunan, Tabo, Binogawan and Cajagwayan of the municipality of Oras in 1948 under Republic Act No. 281 and inaugurated on February 5, 1949. In 1952, the barrio of Santa Monica was transferred from Oras to San Policarpo.

The town was formerly named "Bunga", derived from the plant called bunga which was very abundant in the present site of the town. "Bunga" means fruit, thus the name indicates the fruit of the toils of its founders.

Geography

Barangays
San Policarpo is politically subdivided into 17 barangays.

Climate

Demographics

Economy

The local economy of San Policarpio, one of the country's poorest towns, is dependent on fishing and farming.

References

External links
 [ Philippine Standard Geographic Code]
 Philippine Census Information
 Local Governance Performance Management System

Municipalities of Eastern Samar